Thirumurugan is one of the names of Hindu god Kartikeya and may refer to

Thirumurugan (actor), Tamil actor
Thirumurugan (director), Tamil director
Thirumurugan Gandhi, Tamil activist
Thirumurugan Veeran (born 1983), Malaysian footballer
Thirumuruganatheeswar temple, in  Thirumuruganpoondi
Thirumuruganpoondi, in  Tirupur District, Tamil Nadu